Lycée Français Charles de Gaulle is a French international school in Concepción, Chile. It serves primaire and secondaire levels.

It was founded in the beginning of the year 1944 by the 'Comité Local de la France Libre' now known as the French National Committee founded by Charles de Gaulle.

The school is located at the address: Colo Colo 51, Concepción, Bío Bío, Chile

References

External links
  Lycée Français Charles de Gaulle
  Lycée Français Charles de Gaulle

Schools in Concepción, Chile
French international schools in Chile
Private schools in Chile
Educational institutions established in 1944
1944 establishments in Chile